A rabbinic cabinet or rabbinic council is a branch of a usually secular Jewish organization of some type. Rabbinic cabinets are reserved as advisory and outreach councils for rabbis and cantors who are members of such organizations. They are not to be confused with the associated rabbinical membership and policy bodies of religious and denominational organizations.

Rabbinic cabinets have also been assembled by leaders of Jewish seminaries and educational institutions, such as HUC-JIR's President's Rabbinic Council or JTS's Chancellor's Rabbinic Cabinet. These are usually assembled to help guide educational and administrative policy along a theological or ethical perspective.

Organizations which possess rabbinic cabinets
 Jewish Voice for Peace
 Arzenu
 J Street
 Jewish Federations of North America
 State of Israel Bonds
 Friends of the Israel Defense Forces

References

Rabbinical organizations